Tracy Anthony Simien (born May 21, 1967) is a former professional American football linebacker. He played college football at Texas Christian University. He played eight seasons in the NFL, mainly for the Kansas City Chiefs.

References

1967 births
Living people
American football linebackers
TCU Horned Frogs football players
Montreal Machine players
Kansas City Chiefs players
San Diego Chargers players
Cologne Centurions (NFL Europe) coaches
Houston Texans coaches
People from Bay City, Texas
Pittsburgh Steelers players